Weibo (微博 wēi bó) is a general term for microblogging, but normally understood as Chinese-based mini-blogging services, including social chat sites and platform sharing.

Weibo services makes it possible for internet users to set up real-time information sharing communities individually, and upload and update information.
Weibo services use a format similar to the American-based Twitter-service, but is used almost exclusively by Chinese language speakers. The format of specific features is not exactly identical, such as, for example, hashtags on Sina Weibo and Tencent Weibo, which both employ a double-hashtag "#HashName#" method, since the lack of spacing between Chinese characters necessitates a closing tag.

A major difference – also in this digital arena –
is that characters
in idiom-based scripts,
such as Chinese and
Japanese
can use fewer characters to convey information,
as, for example witnessed by the 280 (formerly 140) characters limit that is in use on Twitter.
In 2016 the 140 character blocks limit was lifted by Sina Weibo.
Sina Weibo is the most visited such site in China. Sina has used the domain name weibo.com for the service since April 2011. Because of the site's popularity and domain name, the term Weibo is often used generically to refer to Sina Weibo or Tencent Weibo.

Weibos are a major source of commentary on a wide range of topics. After the high-speed Wenzhou train collision in 2011 in which 40 people died, online posting played a key role in 
spreading the news quickly and discussing and evaluating government response.

In 2012, there were 309 million people microblogging in China.

Term

Wei boke (微博客) and weixing boke (微型博客), commonly abbreviated as weibo (微博), are Chinese words for "microblog". A China-based microblogging service often names itself a weibo by putting it after the name of the service (e.g. Tencent Weibo, Sina Weibo). A similar word "围脖" is used as Internet slang for "weibo".

History
Fanfou (饭否) is the earliest notable weibo service. It was launched in Beijing on May 12, 2007 by the co-founder of Xiaonei (now Renren) Wang Xing (王兴). The website's layout, API, and mode of use was highly similar to Twitter, which was created earlier in 2006. Fanfou's users increased from 0.3 million to 1 million in the first half of 2009. The users included HP China, the Southern Weekly, artist Ai Weiwei, writer Lian Yue (连岳) and TV commentator Liang Wendao (梁文道).

Some other weibo services, such as Jiwai, Digu, Zuosa and Tencent's Taotao were launched in 2006-2009.

After the July 2009 Ürümqi riots, the CPC government shut down most of the domestic weibo services, including Fanfou and Jiwai. Many popular non China-based microblogging services such as Twitter, Facebook and Plurk have been blocked since then. Sina.com's CEO Charles Chao considered it to be an opportunity.

Sina launched Sina Weibo on August 14, 2009. Its executives invited and persuaded many Chinese celebrities to join the service, which led to strong growth in user numbers.

Two other Chinese Internet portals, Sohu and NetEase, launched the beta versions of their weibo sites almost simultaneously, on January 20, 2010. On January 30, another Internet portal Tencent closed its weibo service, Taotao, and started its new weibo service Tencent Weibo on March 5, 2010. Building on the large number of its instant messaging service QQ's users, Tencent Weibo later attracted more registered users than Sohu Weibo and NetEase Weibo. The public beta versions of NetEase Weibo and Sohu Weibo were launched on March 20 and April 7, 2010, respectively.

All these weibos, provided by the Chinese Internet giants, used the subdomain "t.example.com", such as t.sina.com.cn for Sina Weibo, t.qq.com for Tencent Weibo, t.sohu.com for Sohu Weibo, t.163.com for NetEase Weibo. On 7 April 2011, the leader of the weibo services Sina Weibo started to use an independent domain name weibo.com acquired earlier, in an attempt to build up its own brand.

Sohu Weibo and NetEase Weibo were suspended between July 9–12 and July 13–15, 2010, respectively. Since then, all of the Chinese weibo services have attached a note of "beta version" to their title logos. Commentators said that Sohu Weibo and NetEase Weibo were being "reorganized" by Chinese administrators. The weibo services were not officially approved, so they could only be operated as a "beta version".

Some closed weibos were re-opened under restrictions in 2009 or 2010, including Fanfou, which was re-launched in November 2010. Most of Fanfou's users never came back.

Users
Before July 2009, Fanfou was the most influential weibo website. In February 2011, Tencent announced that its weibo registrations had exceeded 100 million. This threshold was officially passed by Sina Weibo in March 2011. However, according to iResearch's report on March 30, 2011, Sina Weibo took a commanding lead over its competitors, with 56.5% of China's microblogging market based on active users, and 86.6% based on browsing time.

According to the China Internet Network Information Center, in the first half of 2011, Chinese weibo users increased from 63.11 million to 195 million. By July 2011, 40.2% Chinese Internet users and 34.0% Chinese mobile Internet users used weibo/microblogs. In Dec 2010, it had been, respectively, 13.8% and 15.5%.

Quite a number of studies revealed that the active microblog users are government departments in China. For example, the top 5 Weibo microbloggers on the topic construction safety were government departments. The People's Liberation Army makes extensive use of weibo for psychological warfare, public opinion warfare, and United Front activities related to Taiwan.

Censorship and free speech

In July 2009, Chinese microblogs were severely curtailed when most of the domestic weibo services such as Fanfou were shut down. But it brought the birth of others, such as Tencent Weibo and Sina Weibo, operated by large Chinese Internet companies. Sohu Weibo and NetEase Weibo were suspended in July 2010 under the order of the Chinese administrators. Weibo is now operated as a "beta version", enabling the user to circumvent prohibition.

Due to the Internet censorship in China, all of the China-based weibo services are now controlled by various self-censorship policies and methods. They usually have an automatically checked list of blacklisted keywords. Sometimes administrators monitor these manually. Posts on topics which are sensitive and forbidden in China (e.g. Human Rights, Liu Xiaobo) are deleted, and the user's account may be blocked.

From 29 July 2020, Cyberspace Administration will carry out a three-month special censorship action to We-Media in China. One topic of the action is distributing We-Media accounts, which are on 13 major platforms including WeChat and Weibo, into different classes and categories. The action aims to stop We-Media's spreading false information, incorrectly discussing the history of CPC and China, promoting wrong perspective of values, malicious marketing and extortion. 

Some scandals and controversies such as the Li Gang incident, were uncovered by weibo. After incidents such as the Wenzhou train collision and the 2010 Shanghai fire, criticism of the CPC government increased on weibo.

Although weibo services have not always met the approval of the government, many Chinese officials have opened weibo accounts. The official newspaper of the Central Committee of the Chinese Communist Party, the People's Daily, also launched its own People's Weibo (人民微博) in February 2010, with some governmental organizations and officials blogging on it.

Recent studies have shown that official microblogging has become a sophisticated e-government effort for social management, especially for local governments and state units. It has led to a gradual change in local government's social governance strategy and functional change from being a service provider to a 'service predictor'. The latter requires enhanced capabilities to deliver individualized services and institute state surveillance via commercial service providers. In doing so, government units are experimenting with ways of interaction and negotiation with the microblogging public and service providers in their attempt to improve social management and political legitimacy. This negotiation process also exposes and/or creates inter-governmental tensions, since local governments in China consist of distinct units with their own particular preferences and operation procedures.

The "Real Name" policy
Since 2011, there have been rumors that the government will institute a "Real Name" policy for Weibo users. Early in February 2012, China's four key weibo companies – Sina, Sohu, NetEase and Tencent – announced that March 16, 2012, was the deadline for users to adopt their real name identity.

The "Real Name" policy requires all users on Chinese weibos to register with the name on their government issued ID card. However, the username that shows on their homepage doesn't have to be their real legal name. The Real Name Policy would assist the government in controlling speech and communication on the Internet, and would facilitate Internet censorship.

Although the regulation was supposed to take effect on March 16, 2012, the policy was not implemented. Many weibo users complained about this policy, and Sina Weibo started to censor posts that contain the phrase "real name registration" or any related terms on its services from March 19, 2012.

A "Big V" is a microblogger with a substantial following and a verified account such as Kong Qingdong.

Relevant policies
(directly translated from the official regulation)

Alphabetical list of notable China-based microblogging/weibo services

Baidu Talk (百度说吧), launched by Baidu, closed
Digu (嘀咕)
Fanfou (饭否), one of the earliest weibo services, highly similar to Twitter, closed due to Chinese censorship, re-opened in November 2010
Follow5
Hexun Weibo (和讯微博), launched by Hexun
Jiwai (叽歪)
NetEase Weibo (网易微博), launched by NetEase
People's Weibo (人民微博), launched by People's Daily
Phoenix Weibo (凤凰微博), launched by Phoenix Television
Sina Weibo (新浪微博), launched by SINA Corporation, by far the most popular weibo in China, with over 300 million users (Official website)
Sohu Weibo (搜狐微博), launched by Sohu
Tencent Weibo (腾讯微博), launched by Tencent Holdings
Tianya Weibo (天涯微博), launched by Tianya Club
Xinhua Weibo (新华微博), launched by Xinhua News Agency
Zuosa (做啥)
CNTV Weibo (央视微博), launched by CNTV

Chinese microbloggers on Twitter 
Ai Wei-wei, a well-known Chinese artist and activist, who has been arrested and controlled by the Chinese government, is one of the most active Chinese microbloggers on Twitter.

Due to the strict Internet censorship policy on microblogging enacted by the CPC government, a number of Chinese microbloggers choose to make posts that contain "sensitive contents" on Twitter. Although Twitter has been blocked in China since 2009, most Twitter users who reside in China can access the Twitter website using a proxy. More information can be found on List of websites blocked in China.

Twitter users include Chinese nationals, who participated in, or led, the Chinese democracy movement that took place on June 4, 1989, such as Liu Xiaobo, the 2010 Nobel Peace Prize winner  and a political prisoner in China.

Weibo's most significant competition is rival microblogging service, WeChat, as of 2014 the country's leading messaging application.

See also
Microblogging
Comparison of microblogging services
Internet in the People's Republic of China
Internet censorship in the People's Republic of China

Notes

References

Microblogging
Chinese websites